Dafna Michaelson Jenet (born November 14, 1972) is a Democratic member of the Colorado House of Representatives. She represents House District 32 and prior to redistricting, District 30, which covered a portion of Adams County including parts of Commerce City, Aurora, Brighton, Henderson, Bennett, Keensburg, Strasburg, and Thornton. She was elected to her seat in 2016, unseating Republican incumbent JoAnn Windholz.

Michaelson Jenet and her husband Michael Jenet founded the nonprofit Journey Institute. She is the sister of Yehiel Mark Kalish, the only Rabbi to serve in the Illinois House of Representatives. She published her first book, It Takes a Little Crazy to Make a Difference in 2015. The book, which describes her yearlong tour of all 50 states in 2009, won the 2015 International Book Award in the social change category. She published her second book, Peanut's Legacy, in 2017. In it, she describes the loss of her final pregnancy.

Michaelson Jenet serves as Chair of House Public and Behavioral Healthcare and Human Services Committee. She also serves on the Legislative Audit Committee and on the House Education Committee and was chair of the Interim School Safety Committee in 2019. In 2018, Michaelson Jenet was elected caucus chair by her peers in the General Assembly.

Elections

2016 
Michaelson Jenet was elected to the Colorado House of Representatives in 2016, defeating Republican incumbent JoAnn Windholz by a margin of 8 points. In her first campaign for public office, Michaelson Jenet was one of 161 candidates across the country endorsed by President Obama. Her 2016 campaign was targeted by the Democratic Legislative Campaign Committee as one of 52 “essential races” around the country.

2018 
Michaelson Jenet was re-elected to the Colorado House of Representatives in 2018 and once again endorsed by President Obama. Her 2018 campaign was designated as a "race to watch" by the Democratic Legislative Campaign Committee as one of the critical 2018 midterm races in battleground states.

Colorado State Legislature

2017 legislative session 
In the 2017 legislative session, Michaelson Jenet worked on issues of veterans affairs, mental health, and housing. She introduced a bill to create a statewide metric for Colorado's institutions of higher education to award college credit to veterans based on the skills and education they received while serving their country. The bill was chosen by House Speaker Crisanta Duran as one of the first five to be introduced in the session. The bill passed and was signed by Governor John Hickenlooper on June 1, 2017.

2018 legislative session 
In the 2018 Legislative Session, Michaelson Jenet sponsored HB18-1245 which eliminated the practice of conversion therapy on minors. Continuing her work in the mental health space she created the Office of the Behavioral Healthcare Ombudsman One of her other major accomplishments was HB18-1177 which lowered the age of consent for minors from 15 to 12 for Behavioral Healthcare services.

2019 legislative session 
In the 2019 Legislative Session, Michaelson Jenet passed the "Expand Child Nutrition School Lunch Protection Act". Begun in the Senate in 2018, this Act expanded the benefits of free lunch to students who qualified for reduced price lunch from 6th through 12th grade. Following a horrific case of abuse that the 17th Judicial District DA Dave Young called out to the Legislature for support in tightening the laws she passed HB19-1155 which included updates to the definition of "sexual contact".

2019 interim session 
Following another school shooting in Colorado a renewed School Safety Committee was formed and Michaelson Jenet served as Chair.  This bipartisan committee moved forward 5 pieces of legislation for the 2020 Legislative Session to consider.

In March 2020, during the COVID-19 pandemic in the United States, Michaelson Jenet tested positive for COVID-19. Michaelson Jenet was notified by her doctor that he mis-read the results of the test and she instead tested positive for Coronavirus NL63.

2020 legislative session 
During the 2020 session Rep. Michaleson Jenet continued her focus on Behavioral health and Education.  She passed bill HB20-1411: COVID-19 Funds Allocation for Behavioral Health, which set aside funding for receiving mental health services during the COVID-19 pandemic. She also passed HB20-1336: Holocaust and Genocide Studies in Public Schools which put an emphasis on remembering history especially as the survivors with firsthand accounts pass on.

2021 legislative session 
In the 2021 legislative session, Michaelson Jenet continued to advocate for mental health legislation. Notably, she sponsored the “Insurance Coverage Mental Health Wellness Exam Act,” which allowed all Coloradans to access an annual mental health examination covered by insurance. Additionally, Michaelson Jenet also supported “Rapid Mental Health Response For Colorado Youth,” which provided three free therapy sessions to youth in Colorado which led to the creation of the “I Matter” program.

References

External links
Official campaign website

21st-century American politicians
Living people
Democratic Party members of the Colorado House of Representatives
Women state legislators in Colorado
21st-century American women politicians
People from Tel Aviv
People from Commerce City, Colorado
Yeshiva University alumni
Stern College for Women alumni
University of Denver alumni
1972 births
Jewish American state legislators in Colorado
21st-century American Jews